Kim Dong-hyun (born 12 February 1989), also known mononymously as Donghyun, is a South Korean actor, model and singer. He is known for his leads roles in dramas such as The Miracle, Good Morning Double-Decker Bus and The 1km Distance Between Us. He is a member of Boyfriend.

Biography and career
He was born on February 12, 1989, in Seoul. He completed his studies in Myongji University. Donghyun is the stage name of Kim Dong Hyun. He is a South Korean singer and actor who is best known for being the leader and lead vocalist for the K-pop boy group Boyfriend. He debuted with the six-member group in 2011. In addition to his musical activities. He also joined acting his first acting was in MBC drama Elephant in 2008. Donghyun and his bandmates made their acting debuts in the 2013 Japanese idol drama “GOGO Ikemen 5. He also starred in the 2016 Korean television drama The Miracle.

Discography

Filmography

Television series

Film

Television show

Awards and nominations
 2014 Asia Model Festival Awards: Male Rookie of the Year (Musical Category)

References

External links 
 
 
 

1989 births
Living people
21st-century South Korean male actors
South Korean male models
South Korean male television actors
South Korean male film actors
South Korean male idols